Lunnan is a Norwegian surname. Notable people with the surname include:
Randi Lunnan (born 1963), Norwegian organizational theorist
Andreas Lunnan (1940-2012), Norwegian television presenter

Norwegian-language surnames